The 2016 Charleston Battery season is the club's 24th year of existence, and their seventh season in the third tier of the United States Soccer Pyramid. It is their sixth season in the United Soccer League as part of the Eastern Conference.

Current roster

Competitions

Preseason

USL Regular season

Standings

Matches

Usl Pro playoffs

Schedule source

U.S. Open Cup

Midseason Friendlies

References

2016 USL season
American soccer clubs 2016 season
2016 in sports in South Carolina
Charleston Battery seasons